The 125th district of the Texas House of Representatives contains parts of Bexar County. The current Representative is Ray Lopez, who was first elected in 2019.

References 

125